Antoine le Blanc (c. 1800 – September 6, 1833) was a 19th-century murderer and a French immigrant to the United States.

Le Blanc went to New York to seek his fortune after being disowned by his family in France. He spoke little to no English and committed the crime only a few weeks after he arrived in the United States.

In 1833, a few weeks after his arrival in the country, le Blanc was allowed to live in the small, dank basement of the Morristown, New Jersey farmhouse of the Judge Samuel Sayre family, in exchange for chopping wood and feeding hogs. He was unpaid. After two weeks of taking orders and hard work, he became angry and murdered the farmer by hitting him in the back with an ax, his wife Sarah, whom he killed with a club, and their servant Phoebe, who may have been a slave. He proceeded to ransack the house for valuables.

After the crime was discovered, le Blanc was tracked down, captured and tried. The local judge ordered him hanged and dissected. Le Blanc was hanged for his crime before over ten thousand witnesses on September 6, 1833.  After his death, le Blanc was taken to a medical lab and experimented on with electrical currents. Later, his skin was "dissected" to be made into wallets, purses, lampshades, and book jackets. His face was made into a plaster mask. The death mask of Antoine le Blanc and some other products eventually passed to Carl Scherzer, a collector of 19th-century artifacts.

References

External links
Sayre family: lineage of Thomas Sayre, a founder of Southampton, by Theodore Melvin Banta
S.P. Hull's report of the trial and conviction of Antoine Le Blanc for the murder of the Sayre family : at Morristown, N.J., on the night of the eleventh of May, 1833 : with his confession, as given to Mr. A. Boisaubin, the interpreter.

1833 deaths
People from Morristown, New Jersey
French people executed abroad
People executed for murder
People executed by New Jersey by hanging
19th-century executions of American people
People convicted of murder by New Jersey
19th-century executions by the United States
French people convicted of murder
Year of birth uncertain
Executed French people
1833 murders in the United States